Sergio Bueno Pedraza (born 26 January 1997) is a Mexican professional footballer who plays as a midfielder for Colima.

Personal life
Bueno's father, also named Sergio, is a football manager and former footballer.

References

1997 births
Living people
Mexican footballers
Association football midfielders
Chiapas F.C. footballers
Atlante F.C. footballers
Ascenso MX players
Liga Premier de México players
Tercera División de México players
Footballers from Mexico City